The Plattsmouth Bridge is a truss bridge over the Missouri River connecting Cass County, Nebraska, and Mills County, Iowa at Plattsmouth, Nebraska. Until 2014, it carried U.S. Highway 34 across the river.

The bridge has seven spans, including the  cantilevered through truss over the river's navigable channel. It is anchored by  through spans, with two  and two  deck trusses over the eastern flood plain.

The bridge was built in 1929, replacing a ferry that previously operated at the site. It was designed by the Omaha Structural Steel Works.

In November 2006 it was decided to repair the bridge rather than build new bridges. Earlier plans had called for a new $42 million two-lane bridge and bypass of Plattsmouth.

In November 2007, ownership of the bridge was transferred from the private Plattsmouth Bridge company to the public Plattsmouth Bridge Commission. Between April 21, 2008, and November 9, 2008, the bridge was closed as part of a federally funded bridge restoration. The bridge reopened November 9, 2008. As of 2011, the toll for cars was $1.25. In 2018, the toll for cars was raised to $1.75.

In 2014, Highway 34 was rerouted to a new four-lane bridge farther upstream, north of the Platte River and above its junction with the Missouri.

Structural repairs were completed in 2018, allowing the weight limit to be increased to 40,000 pounds; the toll was increased to $1.75.

See also

List of bridges documented by the Historic American Engineering Record in Iowa
List of bridges documented by the Historic American Engineering Record in Nebraska
List of crossings of the Missouri River

References

External links

Nebraska study on replacing the bridge

Eomaha Forum article

Truss bridges in the United States
Buildings and structures in Mills County, Iowa
Buildings and structures in Cass County, Nebraska
U.S. Route 34
Bridges completed in 1929
Road bridges on the National Register of Historic Places in Nebraska
Bridges over the Missouri River
Road bridges on the National Register of Historic Places in Iowa
Bridges of the United States Numbered Highway System
Historic American Engineering Record in Iowa
Historic American Engineering Record in Nebraska
Interstate vehicle bridges in the United States
Toll bridges in Iowa
Toll bridges in Nebraska
National Register of Historic Places in Mills County, Iowa
Steel bridges in the United States
Cantilever bridges in the United States